The Molise regional election of 1980 took place on 8 June 1980.

Events
Christian Democracy was by far the largest party, gaining more than three times the share of vote of the Italian Communist Party, which came distantly second.

After the election Florindo D'Aimmo, the incumbent Christian Democratic President, was re-elected, but he was replaced by Giustino D'Uva in 1982 and later by Ulderico Colagiovanni in 1984.

Results

Source: Ministry of the Interior

Elections in Molise
1980 elections in Italy
June 1980 events in Europe